Jenifer Brening (born 15 December 1996 in Berlin, Germany) is a  German singer and songwriter who represented San Marino in the Eurovision Song Contest 2018 in Lisbon, Portugal, with the song "Who We Are", alongside Jessika. She previously participated in the talent show The Winner Is ... and in the eleventh season of the talent show Deutschland sucht den Superstar.

Discography

Album

Extended plays

Singles

As lead artist

As featured artist

References

1996 births
Eurovision Song Contest entrants of 2018
Living people
Eurovision Song Contest entrants for San Marino
Singers from Berlin
21st-century German women singers